Eupithecia arenbergeri is a moth in the family Geometridae. It is found in Russia and Turkey.

References

Moths described in 1976
arenbergeri
Moths of Asia